Vladimir Lvovich Mashkov (Russian: Владимир Львович Машков; born 27 November 1963) is a Soviet and Russian actor and director of cinema, known to Western audiences for his work in the 2001 film Behind Enemy Lines and 2011 film Mission: Impossible – Ghost Protocol. Mashkov has also worked as a film director, producer and writer for the 2004 Russian film Papa.

Politically, Mashkov is noted for his public support for Vladimir Putin and Russia's invasion of Ukraine.

Biography

Early life and education 
Mashkov was born on 27 November 1963, in Tula, Russian SFSR, Soviet Union (now Russia). His mother, Natalia  (1927–1986), was a puppet theatre director, and his father, Lev Mashkov (1925–1987), was an actor.

He made his debut on stage as a child, took part in the productions of a school theater group, performed with his parents in the Novokuznetsk Puppet Theater. In the late 1970s, Mashkov entered the biological faculty of Novosibirsk State University, but studied there for only a year, after which he entered the Novosibirsk Theater School, from which in 1984 he was expelled because of improper behavior. In 1990, he graduated from the Moscow Art Theater School, studied at the course of Oleg Tabakov.

Career 
In 1989–1990 he was an actor of the Moscow Art Theater named after A.P. Chekhov. Since 1990, he joined the troupe of the Oleg Tabakov Theater. He starred in the productions The Sailor's Silence (Abram Schwartz), The Inspector General (The Governor), The Myth of Don Juan (Don Juan), The Mechanical Piano (Platonov), Anecdotes (Ivanovich, Ugarov). Since 1992, Mashkov has also become one of the directors of the Tabakov Theater. He staged performances there of Star Time on Local Time (1992), Passion for Bumbarash (1992) and Death Room (1994). In the Satyricon Theater, he staged the play The Threepenny Opera (1996), in the Moscow Art Theater named after A.P. Chekhov - "No. 13" (2001).

In cinema, Mashkov made his debut in 1989 in the movie Green Goat Fire. After that came roles in the movies Do It — One! (1990), Ha-bi-Assi (1990), Casus improvisus (1991), Love on the Isle of Death (1991), Alaska, Sir! (1992) and Me Ivan, You Abraham (1993). However, in 1994, he was best known for his starring roles in Denis Yevstigneev's Limit and Valery Todorovsky's Moscow Nights films. In 1995, Mashkov also played the main role in Karen Shakhnazarov's melodrama American Daughter. One of the most notable works of this period was the role of Tolyan in the picture The Thief (1997), subsequently nominated for an Oscar. In 2000, he played the role of Emelian Pugachev in the historical film of Alexander Proshkin Russian rebellion.

In the early 2000s, Vladimir Mashkov starred in several Hollywood films: Dancing at the Blue Iguana (2000), 15 Minutes (2001), An American Rhapsody (2001) and Behind Enemy Lines (2001). Mashkov played the Russian millionaire Platon Makovsky, whose prototype was Boris Berezovsky, in Pavel Lungin's 2002 drama Tycoon. The next year, he appeared on television as merchant Rogozhin in the adaptation of Fyodor Dostoyevsky's novel The Idiot, directed by Vladimir Bortko.

In 1997, Vladimir Mashkov made his debut as a filmmaker with the New Year's romantic comedy The Orphan of Kazan. In 2004, he appeared in the role of director, screenwriter and producer of the film Daddy based on Alexander Galich's play The Sailor's Silence, in which he also starred Abram Schwartz.

 He starred in the 2005 adaptation of Boris Akunin's novel The State Counselor, next year he played in the action movie Piranha and the US television series Alias. In 2007, Vladimir Mashkov played detective David Gozman in the historical crime series Liquidation He portrayed the character of a hired killer in the 2008 film The Ghost. His next films were the role of the second pilot Seryoga in the action film based on real events Kandagar (2009) and the image of the machinist Ignat in Alexei Uchitel's drama The Edge (2010). In 2011, Vladimir Mashkov appeared in the American blockbuster Mission: Impossible – Ghost Protocol, where he played Russian agent Sidorov.

In 2015, the thriller TV series Rodina aired on television, directed by Pavel Lungin. Mashkov played officer Alexei Bragin, released from a long imprisonment, who appears to have defected. The disaster film Flight Crew by Nikolai Lebedev premiered in 2016, where Mashkov played experienced pilot Zinchenko. In 2017, the sports drama Going Vertical was released. In this film, Vladimir Mashkov starred in the role of coach of the Soviet basketball team, which at the 1972 Munich Olympics beat the seemingly invincible US team.

He was appointed as artistic director of the Oleg Tabakov Theatre in 2018.

Other activities 
He is a member of the party United Russia, and was a delegate at the XXII Congress of the Party.

In 2011, at a festival of children's amateur doll theaters, named "Doll in Children's Hands" in Novokuznetsk, Siberia, Mashkov announced the establishment of the "Golden Lion" prize, named after Natalya Nikiforova (his mother). Prizes are given to those nominated Best Actor and Best Actress. The first award went to theater actress Galina Romanova, named an Honored Artist of Russia.

In February 2022, he expressed support for the ongoing 2022 Russian invasion of Ukraine in an Instagram post on his official page. On 18 March 2022, Mashkov spoke at Vladimir Putin's Moscow rally celebrating the annexation of Crimea by the Russian Federation from Ukraine and justifying the 2022 Russian invasion of Ukraine. Also he initiated the placement of military symbol Z on the front of the Oleg Tabakov Theatre.

Grand Theft Auto IV 
Mashkov claims he was in discussions with Rockstar Games to voice the character of Niko Bellic in Grand Theft Auto IV and that the character's appearance is based on him, specifically from his role of the Tracker in the 2001 movie Behind Enemy Lines, but he ultimately turned down the offer. Rockstar Games have not commented on Mashkov's claims.

Personal life 
Mashkov has one daughter, Maria, from his marriage with actress Yelena Shevchenko, from whom he is now divorced. Maria is living in United States and she is also an actress. Maria criticized her father’s support for the invasion in Ukraine.

He is also an active supporter of United Russia.

Sanctions 
In July 2022 the EU imposed sanctions on Vladimir Mashkov in relation to the 2022 Russian invasion of Ukraine.

Awards
1994 San Raphael Russian Cinema Festival: Blue Sail Award for Limita (1994)
1994 Sochi Open Russian Film Festival: Best Actor Award for Limita (1994)
1995 Geneva Film Festival: International Jury Prize for Limita (1994)
1995 Geneva Film Festival: Youth Jury Award for Limita (1994)
1997 Open CIS and Baltic Film Festival: Best Actor Award for The Thief (1997)
1997  Sozvezdie: Best Actor Award for The Thief (1997)
1998 Nika Awards: Best Actor Award for The Thief (1997)
2001 23rd Moscow International Film Festival: Silver St. George Best Actor Award for The Quickie (2001)
2004 26th Moscow International Film Festival: Audience Award for Papa (2004) (shared with Ilya Rubinstein)

Credits

Film

Zelyonyy ogon' kozy (The Goat's Green Fire) (1989)
Ha-bi-assy (1990)
Do It — One! (1990)
Lyubov na ostrove smerti (Love at the Death Island) (1991)
Alyaska, ser! (Alaska, Sir!) (1992)
Me Ivan, You Abraham (1993) .... Aaron
Limita (1994) .... Ivan
Katya Ismailova (1994) .... Sergey
Amerikanskaya doch (American Daughter) (1995) .... Alexei
Koroli i kapusta (Cabbages and Kings) (1996) (voice)
Noch pered Rozhdestvom (1997) (voice) .... Devil
The Thief (1997) ... Tolyan
 (Sympathy Seeker) (1997) .... Stall holder
 (Composition for Victory Day) (1998)
 (Two Moons, Three Suns) (1998) .... Alexei
Mama (Mommy) (1999) .... Nikolai Yuryev
Russkiy bunt (The Captain's Daughter) (2000) .... Yemelyan Pugachyov
Dancing at the Blue Iguana (2000) .... Sacha
15 Minutes (2001) .... Milos Karlova
An American Rhapsody (2001) .... Frank
The Quickie (2001) .... Oleg
Behind Enemy Lines (2001) .... Sasha
Tycoon  (2002) .... Platon
Daddy (2004) .... Abraham Schwartz
The State Counsellor (2005) .... Kozyr
Piranha (2006) .... Mazur
Piter FM (2006)
The Ghost (2008) ... The Ghost (Domovoy)
Kandahar (2010) ... Sergei
The Edge (2010) ... Ignat
Mission: Impossible – Ghost Protocol (2011) ... Anatoly Sidorov
Raspoutine (2011) .... Nicholas II
Pepel (Ashes) (2013) .... Igor Anatolievich Pietrov, former captain of the Red Army
The Duelist (2016) .... Graf Beklemishev
Flight Crew (2016)
Going Vertical (2017)
Hero (2019) .... Oleg Rodin
Who's There? (2022) .... Pavel
The Challenge (2023)

Television
Casus Improvisus (1991)
 (1996)
The Idiot (2003) .... Parfyon Rogozhin
Alias (2005) .... Milo Kradic
Liquidation (2007) .... David Markovich Gotsman
Grigoriy R. (2014) .... Grigori Rasputin
Rodina (2015) .... Naval Infantry colonel Alexey Bragin
Raid (2017) .... Police officer Oleg Kaplan

Theatre

My Big Land
Biloxi Blues
The Inspector General
Don Juan

Director

Film
Sirota kazanskaya (Sympathy Seeker) (1997)
Papa (Daddy and Father) (2004)

Theatre
A Star Hour By Local Time
Passions for Bumbarash
The Death-Defying Act
The Threepenny Opera

Writer
Papa (Daddy and Father) (2004)

Producer
Papa (Daddy and Father) (2004)

References

External links
 

1963 births
Living people
People from Tula, Russia
Russian nationalists
Anti-Ukrainian sentiment in Russia
Russian male film actors
Russian male television actors
Russian male stage actors
Russian film directors
Soviet male actors
20th-century Russian male actors
21st-century Russian male actors
Honored Artists of the Russian Federation
People's Artists of Russia
Recipients of the Nika Award
United Russia politicians
21st-century Russian politicians
Moscow Art Theatre School alumni
Academicians of the National Academy of Motion Picture Arts and Sciences of Russia
Russian individuals subject to European Union sanctions